This is a list of films produced in Pakistan in 2000 (see 2000 in film) and in the Urdu language.

2000

See also
2000 in Pakistan

External links
 Search Pakistani film - IMDB.com

2000
Pakistani
Films